David Cuéllar Tainta (born 1 November 1979) is a Spanish retired footballer who played as a right winger.

Club career
Born in Pamplona, Navarre, Cuéllar came through the youth ranks of Athletic Bilbao, but managed to play just 14 games without scoring from 2000 to 2002, eventually leaving the club. His debut with the first team came on 20 December 2000, coming as a late substitute in a 1–1 home draw against Valencia CF.

After two years with Elche CF and two with Gimnàstic de Tarragona in the second division, Cuéllar made a comeback to La Liga with the latter team in the 2006–07 season (scoring his first goal in the top flight on 24 September 2006 in a 2–2 home draw with Racing de Santander) before earning himself a move back to Athletic for the following campaign, where he appeared in only seven matches.

Subsequently, Cuéllar joined Real Murcia who had been just relegated to division two, appearing rarely in his first year. On 31 August 2009 he was loaned for a season to another side in that tier, UD Salamanca, being released by the former in the following off-season.

Personal life
Cuéllar's older brother, Crescencio (born 1970), was also a footballer. A forward who was also brought up in Lezama, he managed four appearances in the first division, with Athletic (one match) and CP Mérida (three), plus almost 300 in the second tier. Another brother, José Luis, played at the regional third level as a defender.

Honours
Basconia
Tercera División: 1997–98

References

External links

1979 births
Living people
Footballers from Pamplona
Spanish footballers
Association football wingers
La Liga players
Segunda División players
Segunda División B players
Tercera División players
Divisiones Regionales de Fútbol players
CD Basconia footballers
Bilbao Athletic footballers
Athletic Bilbao footballers
Elche CF players
Gimnàstic de Tarragona footballers
Real Murcia players
UD Salamanca players
CF Reus Deportiu players
Spain youth international footballers